Belgrave Road Cycle and Cricket Ground is a former sports ground in Leicester which hosted early matches of Leicester Fosse, who re-formed as Leicester City and Leicester Tigers.  In June 1881 it also hosted Leicestershire County Cricket Club against an All England XI.  The ground was situated a mile north of the town and opened in 1880, it was short-lived as a ground though, and was closed in 1901 when houses, shops and part of the British United Shoe Machinery were built on the site.  Now the area is bordered by Roberts Road, Buller Road, Macdonald Road.

The ground was opened on 5 May 1880 by Edwyn Sherard Burnaby, the MP for Leicestershire North, as a 10-acre site with mile long running and cycling tracks, cricket and football pitches and hosted Leicester Tigers first official game against Moseley on 23 October of that year.

The ground was enclosed which allowed a gate to be taken.  However this harmed the ability to build a following so Tigers moved to Victoria Park in January 1881.  The rugby club moved back for 1882/83 season before reverting yet again to Victoria Park.  Leicester Fosse, a forerunner of Leicester City played soccer at the ground for the 1887/88 season, their fourth, however only lasted one season before being outbid for use of the ground by Leicester Tigers.

Tigers played at the ground until leaving for Welford Road in 1892.

Tigers Record

References 

Leicester City F.C.
Leicester Tigers
Defunct rugby union venues in England
Defunct football venues in England
Sports venues in Leicester